Each of the 12 teams of Minor League Baseball's Midwest League carry a 30-man active roster. Only these players are eligible to play.

Teams may have any number of inactive players on their rosters at a given time who do not count toward active roster limits. Injured players may be placed on the injured list (7-day or 60-day). The temporary inactive list and bereavement list are for players attending to personal matters. Major league players may be placed on rosters for injury rehabilitation for a maximum of 20 days for non-pitchers and 30 days for pitchers.

Players who are ineligible to play due to failure to adhere to the Minor League Drug Prevention and Treatment Program, violations of their contract, who are receiving team disciplinary action, or who are unable to join the team due to visa problems may be placed on the restricted or suspended lists. These players count against a team's active roster limit.

Each team usually has a three-man coaching staff including a manager, hitting coach, and pitching coach. Depending on each Major League Baseball organization's development approach, some teams may have additional coaches.

East Division

Dayton Dragons

Fort Wayne TinCaps

Great Lakes Loons

Lake County Captains

Lansing Lugnuts

West Michigan Whitecaps

West Division

Beloit Sky Carp

Cedar Rapids Kernels

Peoria Chiefs

Quad Cities River Bandits

South Bend Cubs

Wisconsin Timber Rattlers

See also
List of Northwest League team rosters
List of South Atlantic League team rosters

References

Midwest League
Rosters
Midwest League team rosters